Galloping Thunder may refer to:

 Galloping Thunder (1927 film), a silent western film directed by Scott Pembroke
 Galloping Thunder (1946 film), a western film directed by Ray Nazarro